The 2015–16 Tennessee Lady Volunteers basketball team represented the University of Tennessee in the 2015–16 college basketball season. The Lady Vols, led by 4th year head coach Holly Warlick, play their games at Thompson–Boling Arena and are members of the Southeastern Conference.

In the February 21 game against LSU, Diamond DeShields scored her 1,000th point. She is the sixth Lady Vol to score 1,000 in her second season and the 43rd to record 1,000 in her career.

Despite having a lackluster performance during the season that dropped them out of the national top-25 ranks in the latter half, Tennessee made it to the semifinals of the SEC Tournament. There, they lost to Mississippi State, 58–48. The Lady Vols also received an at-large invitation to the NCAA Tournament, and advanced to the Elite Eight, before losing 89–67 to Syracuse.

Roster

Rankings

Schedule and Results

|-
!colspan=9 style="background:#F77F00; color:white;"| Exhibition

|-
!colspan=9 style="background:#F77F00; color:white;"| Regular season

|-
!colspan=9 style="background:#F77F00;"| 2016 SEC Tournament

|-
!colspan=9 style="background:#F77F00;"| NCAA Women's Tournament

Source:

See also
 2015–16 Tennessee Volunteers basketball team

References

Tennessee Lady Volunteers basketball seasons
Tennessee
Tennessee
Volunteers
Volunteers